Akuapemhene is another name for a ruler of Akuapem. The word is only used in Akuapem.

References

Akan language